Geoffrey Brind Jameson  is a structural chemist and biologist at Massey University in Palmerston North, New Zealand. He is the director of the Centre for Structural Biology, and a crystallographer, using X-ray crystallography and NMR spectroscopy to determine the structure of materials.

Jameson was the 2011 recipient of the Marsden Medal from the New Zealand Association of Scientists.

References

University of Canterbury alumni
Georgetown University faculty
Academic staff of the Massey University
New Zealand scientists
Crystallographers
Living people
Year of birth missing (living people)
New Zealand biochemists